Onur Uras (born January 1, 1985) is a Turkish Olympic swimmer who specialized in the butterfly stroke. He is a four-time Turkish national champion, and a member of Galatasaray Swimming Club in Istanbul, under his head coach Yilmaz Ozuak. Uras is also a former varsity swimmer for the Georgia Tech Yellow Jackets, and a graduate of industrial engineering at the Georgia Institute of Technology in Atlanta, Georgia.

Career
Uras made his first Turkish team, as a 19-year-old, at the 2004 Summer Olympics in Athens, where he competed in the men's 100 m butterfly. He rounded out the third heat to last place and forty-ninth overall by 0.15 of a second behind Algeria's Aghiles Slimani in 56.37 seconds.

At the 2008 Summer Olympics in Beijing, Uras qualified again for the men's 100 m butterfly, by establishing a Turkish record and clearing a FINA B-standard entry time of 53.97 from the Speedo Champion Series in Atlanta. He challenged seven other swimmers on the same heat, including three-time Olympians Jeremy Knowles of the Bahamas, Georgi Palazov of Bulgaria, and Camilo Becerra of Colombia. He edged out Palazov to take a seventh spot by 0.46 of a second in 54.79. Uras failed to advance into the semifinals, as he placed fifty-eighth overall in the preliminaries.

References

External links
Player Bio – Georgia Tech Yellow Jackets
NBC Olympics Profile

1985 births
Living people
Turkish male butterfly swimmers
Olympic swimmers of Turkey
Swimmers at the 2004 Summer Olympics
Swimmers at the 2008 Summer Olympics
Sportspeople from Istanbul
Galatasaray Swimming swimmers
Georgia Tech Yellow Jackets men's swimmers